Commandant Sri Lanka Army Volunteer Force (SLAVF) has been the title of the head of the Sri Lanka Army Volunteer Force. The post is held by a regular officer of the rank of major general and is the fourth senior position in the army. Commandant is in charge of the Volunteer Force Headquarters and is assisted by a deputy commandant.

History
Established in 1956 as the Commandant Ceylon Volunteer Force, it was head by the second-ranking member of the General Staff from 1956 to 1966. Since 1966, it became the third-ranking after that of Commander of the Army and Chief of Staff. In the early 1990s with the creation of the post of Deputy Chief of Staff it became the fourth-ranking position in the army and has become a two-star (Major General) since the early 1980s.

List of commandants

 Colonel H. W. G. Wijeyekoon OBE ED
 Colonel M A G De Mel psc
 Colonel B R Heyn
 Colonel S. D. Ratwatte ED
 Brigadier B K V J E Rodrigo VSV ndc psc MA
 Brigadier H V Athukorale psc FBIM
 Brigadier E G Thewanaygam VSV
 Brigadier C A M N Silva VSV USAWC
 Major General H Wanasinghe ndc
 Major General S M A Jayawardena VSV ndc psc
 Brigadier N G A L D S De Wijesekara
 Major General Y Balarathna Rajah ndc
 Major General G H De Silva ndc
 Major General C J Abayaratna
 Major General A M U Seneviratne ndc
 Major General T N De Silva
 Major General W R Wijeyaratne
 Major General H S Hapuarachchi USP
 Major General E H Samaratunga USP
 Major General J Nammuni USP
 Major General A K Jayawardhana RWP RSP rcds psc
 Major General H N W Dias RWP RSP VSV USP ndc IG
 Major General A E D Wijendra RSP USP ndc psc MSC
 Major General S H S Kottegoda WWV RWP RSP USP ndc
 Major General A M C W P Seneviratna UPS ndc psc
 Major General G S C Fonseka RWP RSP VSV USP rcds psc
 Major General M D S Chandrapala USP ndu psc
 Major General N Mallawaarachchi RWP USP ndc psc
 Major General D V S Y Kulatunga RSP USP ndc psc
 Major General U B L Fernando RWP RSP ndu psc
 Major General S R Balasuriya USP ndc psc IG
 Major General J J P S T Liyanage RSP USP ndc IG ldmc
 Major General D R A B Jayathilaka RWP RSP VSV USP ldmc
 Major General A W J C De Silva RWP USP ndu psc
 Major General S A P P Samarasinghe RSP USP psc
 Major General S W L Daulagala RSP USP ndu
 Major General HCP Goonetilleke RSP VSV USP ndc psc
 Major General MHSB Perera RWP RSP USP ndu psc PhD
 Major General A P de Z Wickramaratne RWP ndu psc
 Major General G R H Dias VSV USP ndc psc IG
 Major General S D T Liyanage WWV RWP USP ndc psc
 Major General L M Mudalige RWP RSP ndu
 Major General N A Dharmaratne WWV RWP RSP ndu psc
 Major General H J S Gunawardena RSP VSV USP ndc psc
 Major General T S Bangsajayah RWP RSP VSV USP ndu
 Major General P R Wanigasooriya VSV USP ndu USACGSC
 Major General J M U D Jayasinghe
 Major General K N S Kotuwegoda ndc IG
 Major General C D Weerasuriya RWP RSP ndu
 Major General D G S Senarath Yapa RWP RSP ndu

References

External links
 Past Commandant of the Volunteer Force

1956 establishments in Ceylon
Sri Lanka Army Volunteer Force
Sri Lanka Army appointments
Lists of Sri Lankan military personnel